Thomas Richard Holmes (born 12 March 2000) is an English professional footballer who plays for Championship club Reading, as a defender.

Career

Club

Reading
In July 2017, Holmes signed his first professional deal with Reading, making his debut for Reading on 6 March 2018 in a 1–1 draw against Bolton Wanderers.

Holmes had been in the academy at Reading since the age of 8, and a season ticket holder from age 11,

On 26 February 2019, Holmes signed a new contract with Reading until the summer of 2022.

On 5 December 2021, Holmes scored his first goal for Reading, a Bicycle kick against Hull City.

On 17 June 2022, Holmes signed a new three-year contract with Reading.

On 21 July 2022, Holmes was confirmed as Reading's Vice-Captain for the season, behind Captain Andy Yiadom.

Roeselare Loan
On 2 September 2019 Holmes moved to Belgian First Division B club Roeselare on loan for the 2019–20 season.

Personal life
Born in England, Holmes is of Canadian descent through his grandmother and may be eligible to represent the Canada national team.

Holmes is studying a degree on a part-time basis.

Career statistics

Club

References

External links
 
 Reading Profile

2000 births
Living people
English footballers
Association football defenders
English people of Canadian descent
Reading F.C. players
English Football League players
K.S.V. Roeselare players
Challenger Pro League players
English expatriate sportspeople in Belgium
Expatriate footballers in Belgium